A Lesson in History is a 1957 joint Soviet–Bulgarian historical drama film directed by Lev Arnshtam and Hristo Piskov about Georgi Dimitrov and the Leipzig Trial.

Plot
The year is 1933. Georgi Dimitrov (Stefan Savov) comes to Berlin to establish links with the local Bulgarian communists. The Nazi leaders are doing their best to break the resistance of the Communists. Hermann Göring (Yuri Averin) conceives a provocation: during the arson of the Reichstag, his associate must be caught with a ticket of a member of the Communist Party. The Reichstag is set on fire, the provocateur Marinus van der Lubbe (Georgi Kaloyanchev) and the deputy of the Reichstag Ernst Torgler are arrested. Mass repressions against Communists are commencing. Dimitrov also falls in the hands of the Nazi court. However, in the courtroom, workers, including Heinrich Lange (Gennadi Yudin), prove the falsehood of the accusation. The National Socialists are forced to free Dimitrov. The Soviet government grants him the right of political asylum.

Cast
 Stefan Savov – Georgi Dimitrov
 Tzvetana Arnaudova – Paraskeva Dimitrova
 Ivan Tonev – Stefcho
 Gennadi Yudin – Heinrich Lange
 Borya Burlyaev – Vili Lange
 Apollon Yachnitskiy – Hitler
 Yuri Averin – Gyoring
 Pyotr Berezov – Himler
 Encho Tagarov – Gyobels
 Nikolay Volkov – Heldorf

External links

1957 films
Mosfilm films
Films directed by Lev Arnshtam
Georgi Dimitrov
Bulgarian historical drama films
Soviet historical drama films
Russian historical drama films
Cultural depictions of politicians
Cultural depictions of Bulgarian men
Films set in 1933
Films set in Leipzig
1950s historical drama films